Suji railway station (simplified Chinese: 苏集站; traditional Chinese: 蘇集站; pinyin: Sū Jí Zhàn) is a station of Jingbao Railway in Inner Mongolia.

See also

List of stations on Jingbao railway

Railway stations in China opened in 1922
Railway stations in Inner Mongolia
Qahar Right Front Banner